John David Eddy (born 1944) is a retired  badminton player from England who won national and international titles from the late 1960s to the early 1980s.

Career
Eddy represented England and won a bronze medal in the mixed doubles, at the 1970 British Commonwealth Games in Edinburgh, Scotland. Eight years later he was part of the team that won the gold medal in the new team event, at the 1978 Commonwealth Games in Edmonton, Canada.

Though a highly competent singles player, the crisp hitting Eddy's greatest success came in doubles. He won the gold medal at the 1968 European Badminton Championships in men's doubles with Robert Powell. Two years later he also won the gold medal at the 1970 European Badminton Championships in mixed doubles partnered by Susan Whetnall with whom he shared the All-England mixed doubles title in 1974. Eddy and Powell were men's doubles runners-up at the All-Englands in both 1969 and 1970. Eddy and Eddy Sutton won men's doubles at the Danish Open  in 1975, the only English team to do so since the 1930s. He compiled an impressive winning record on four successive English Thomas Cup (men's international) teams between 1969 and 1979.

He represented Staffordshire at county level.

References 

English male badminton players
Badminton players at the 1970 British Commonwealth Games
Badminton players at the 1978 Commonwealth Games
Commonwealth Games gold medallists for England
Commonwealth Games bronze medallists for England
Living people
Commonwealth Games medallists in badminton
1944 births
Medallists at the 1970 British Commonwealth Games
Medallists at the 1978 Commonwealth Games